Opioid-binding protein/cell adhesion molecule is a protein that in humans is encoded by the OPCML gene.

This gene encodes a member of the IgLON subfamily in the immunoglobulin protein superfamily. The encoded protein is localized in the cell membrane and may have an accessory role in opioid receptor function. This gene has an ortholog in rat and bovine. The opioid binding-cell adhesion molecule encoded by the rat gene binds opioid alkaloids in the presence of acidic lipids, exhibits selectivity for mu ligands and acts as a GPI-anchored protein. Since the encoded protein is highly conserved in species during evolution, it may have a fundamental role in mammalian systems. Two transcript variants encoding different isoforms have been found for this gene.

References

Further reading

External links